Sateda may refer to:
 Sateda, a fictional planet in the Stargate series from where Ronon Dex originates
"Sateda" (Stargate Atlantis), an episode of the TV series Stargate Atlantis